The 2005–06 B Group was the 51st season of the Bulgarian B Football Group, the second tier of the Bulgarian football league system. The season started on 13 August 2005 and finished on 7 June 2006 with the A Group promotion play-off between the runners-up from both divisions.

East B Group

West B Group

Promotion play-off

References 

Second Professional Football League (Bulgaria) seasons
2005–06 in Bulgarian football
Bulgaria